South Jacksonville is a village in Morgan County, Illinois, United States. The population was 3,331 at the 2010 census. It is part of the Jacksonville Micropolitan Statistical Area.

Geography

Demographics

As of the census of 2000, there were 3,475 people, 1,584 households, and 982 families residing in the village. The racial makeup of the village was 97.32% White, 1.04% African American, 0.17% Native American, 0.66% Asian, 0.20% from other races, and 0.60% from two or more races. Hispanic or Latino of any race were 0.75% of the population.

There were 1,584 households, out of which 25.4% had children under the age of 18 living with them, 50.2% were married couples living together, 9.0% had a female householder with no husband present, and 38.0% were non-families. 34.2% of all households were made up of individuals, and 20.4% had someone living alone who was 65 years of age or older. The average household size was 2.18 and the average family size was 2.81.

In the village, the population was spread out, with 20.4% under the age of 18, 7.2% from 18 to 24, 25.2% from 25 to 44, 25.7% from 45 to 64, and 21.5% who were 65 years of age or older. The median age was 43 years. For every 100 females, there were 81.7 males. For every 100 females age 18 and over, there were 78.6 males.

The median income for a household in the village was $37,548, and the median income for a family was $46,373. Males had a median income of $31,827 versus $26,750 for females. The per capita income for the village was $20,973. About 3.8% of families and 6.5% of the population were below the poverty line, including 8.8% of those under age 18 and 8.9% of those age 65 or over.

Tourism
The Prairie Land Heritage Museum is an open-air museum centered around traditional farming methods and antique machinery.  One notable attraction at the museum is its  narrow gauge George Waters Memorial Railroad powered by a real steam locomotive built by Crown Metal Products.

References

Villages in Morgan County, Illinois
Villages in Illinois
Jacksonville, Illinois micropolitan area